The Third Day is the sixth film of Mohammad Hossein Latifi as a director and produced in 2007. This film is based on the documentary of the same name by Hamid Zargarnejad.The film stars Pouria Poursorkh, Baran Kosari and Hamed Behdad. The film shows the last days of battle of Khorramshahr.

Plot 
During the Iran-Iraq War, a disabled young woman is taken captive by Iraqi Baathist forces in Khuzestan Province (in southern Iran). Her brother, along with his fellow combatants, tries to free his sister from the clutches of the enemy.

Awards 
 Statue of the best field special effects of the 11th Cinema House Festival in 2008
 Crystal Simorgh is the best film of the 25th Fajr International Film Festival, 2007
 Crystal Simorgh Best Director of the 25th Fajr International Film Festival 2007
 Crystal Simorgh Best Actress in a Leading Role at the 25th Fajr International Film Festival 2007

References

External links 
 

2007 films
Films whose director won the Best Directing Crystal Simorgh
Iranian war films
2000s Persian-language films
Iran–Iraq War films